Liouguei District (Taivoan: Lakuri) is a rural district of Kaohsiung City, Taiwan. It is the third largest district in Kaohsiung City after Tauyuan District and Namasia District. The place-name is derived from the name of a Taivoan community Lakuri or Lakkuli, which emigrated from Vogavon in Tainan, driven to Kaohsiung by the invasion of Han immigrants and Siraya in the late 17th century.

The residents of this district are mainly Hakka (about 44% ) and Hoklo Taiwanese, as well as indigenous peoples and immigrants from other China provinces. The entire region has been included in the Maolin National Scenic Area. In recent years, the tourism industry has flourished.

History

Due to the invasion of Han in the 17th century, Siraya that originally lived in the plains of Tainan was forced to migrate to Yuchin Basin, which in turn drove Taivoan from Vogavon to Pangliao, Kaohsiung in 1781, reaching nowadays Liouguei in 1799, founding community Lakkuli, also spelled Lakuri or La-ko-li.

In 1902, during early Japanese rule, the area was administered as "Lakkuli Village". In 1920, it became , under , Takao Prefecture. In 1932, Rokuki was annexed into  under Takao Prefecture.

After the handover of Taiwan from Japan to the Republic of China in 1945, Liouguei was incorporated into Kaohsiung County as a rural township. On 25 December 2010, the township became a district of Kaohsiung City.

In August 2019, some residents living in high-risk areas of Liouguei District were evacuated from their homes after heavy rain and flash flooding.

Geology
The district resembles the shape of long gourd with a vertical length of 36 km and a horizontal width of 5 km. The Laonong River passes from north to south through the center of the township.

Administrative divisions
The district consists of Sinwei/Xinwei, Xinxing, Xinliao, Xinfa, Peinong, Liugui, Yibao, Xinglong, Zhongxing, Baolai, Wenwu and Dajin Villages.

Economy
During Japanese rule, the district was known for the production of Camphor oil. The Japanese government constructed a route and tunnels to facilitate the transportation of the product.

Tourist attractions

 Baolai Spring Park
 Bulao Hot Spring
 Liouguei Tunnels
 Maolin National Scenic Area
 18 Arhats Mountain
 Sinwei Forest Ecological Park
 Jinlongshan Cihui Temple (金龍山慈惠堂)

Agricultural Products 

 "Black Diamond" Wax Jambu (Syzygium samarangense)
 Jinhuang Mango
 Jinxuan Oolong Tea
 Jujube

Transportation

 Liouguei Bus Station

See also
 Kaohsiung

References

Districts of Kaohsiung
Taivoan people